Arjunudupalem  is a village in Iragavaram Mandal in the West Godavari district of the Indian state of Andhra Pradesh. Velpuru and Relangi Railway stations are the nearest train stations location at a distance of 7 Km and 8 Km respectively from Arjunudupalam.

Geography
It is located east of the district headquarters, Eluru.

References

Villages in West Godavari district